Joseph Ashton (born November 18, 1986) is a former American actor, who was best known for his role as Oswald "Otto" Rocket in Nickelodeon's animated series Rocket Power.

Early life
Joseph Ashton was born on November 18, 1986 in Cherokee, California, both of his parents claim Cherokee ancestry.

Career
Ashton begin his acting career in 1994, he first appeared before the camera as an infant in a national McDonald's commercial and has worked steadily ever since. He had a regular role on the CBS drama L.A. Doctors. His guest-starring roles on television series include ER, Dr. Quinn Medicine Woman, Walker, Texas Ranger, Martial Law, Cracker and Smart Guy. He appeared in Asylum as Young Tordone on HBO, and the NBC mini series Blind Faith.

Ashton's film debut was in the 1994 remake of The Little Rascals. He notably starred in the title role of the 1997 film, The Education of Little Tree, a well-reviewed low-budget film about a 1930s-era boy discovering his Native American heritage. He earned a Young Artist Award for Best Performance In A Feature Film for the movie. Roger Ebert, in his review said "Ashton, as Little Tree, is another of those young actors who is fresh and natural on camera; I believed in his character." The Boston Phoenix lauded him as "adorable and energetic."

Ashton starred as 'Sonny', in Slappy and the Stinkers and won a Young Artist Award for Best Young Ensemble Performance in a feature film. He also appeared in the 2003 remake of Where the Red Fern Grows, playing the main character, Billy Coleman.

Ashton was also the voice of Otto Rocket on Nickelodeon's Rocket Power cartoon series. He reprised his role as the voice of Otto Rocket in the television movie Rocket Power: Race Across New Zealand for Nickelodeon and in the video games. Ashton has lent his voice to other animated projects including Hey Arnold, Whatever Happened to... Robot Jones? and the animated films Babes in Toyland and Tarzan. Other voice work includes recording an audio book for Christian Day Parenting.

Personal life
He is a graduate of the University of La Verne, where he majored in TV and radio broadcasting.

Filmography

Film

Television

Video games

References

External links

Living people
American male child actors
American male film actors
American male television actors
American male video game actors
American male voice actors
American people of Cherokee descent
University of La Verne alumni
20th-century American male actors
21st-century American male actors
1986 births